Rhythms, Resolutions & Clusters is a remix album by the Chicago-based band Tortoise. It consists entirely of remixed (and retitled) versions of songs from their first album. Some of the remixes were performed by band members, others by friends of the band including Steve Albini, Rick Brown, Jim O'Rourke and Brad Wood.

In 2006, the whole of this album was reissued in A Lazarus Taxon (as the third CD in the box set). The reissue also contains an extra remix by Mike Watt, which was not included in the original release due to timing and technical reasons.

The album was given a limited vinyl release in 2022 for the band's 30th anniversary.

Track listing

References

Tortoise (band) albums
1995 remix albums
Thrill Jockey albums